Monotoca is a genus of about 17 species of shrubs in the family Ericaceae. The genus is endemic to Australia.

Species include:
Monotoca billawinica Albr.
Monotoca elliptica (Sm.) R.Br. – tree broom heath
Monotoca empetrifolia R.Br. 
Monotoca glauca (Labill.) Druce – goldy wood
Monotoca ledifolia A.Cunn. ex DC.
Monotoca leucantha E.Pritz.
Monotoca linifolia (Rodway) W.M.Curtis 
Monotoca oligarrhenoides F.Muell.
Monotoca oreophila Albr. – mountain broom heath
Monotoca rotundifolia J.H.Willis – trailing monotoca
Monotoca scoparia (Sm.) R.Br. – prickly broom heath
Monotoca submutica (Benth.) Jarman

References

 
Ericaceae genera
Ericales of Australia